Éric le Leuch (born June 19, 1971) is a French sprint canoer who competed from 1995 to 2000. He won a bronze medal in the C-4 200 m event at the 1995 ICF Canoe Sprint World Championships in Duisburg.

Eric Le Leuch also competed in two Summer Olympics, earning his best finish of fourth in the C-1 1000 m event at Sydney in 2000.

References

External links 
 

1971 births
Canoeists at the 1996 Summer Olympics
Canoeists at the 2000 Summer Olympics
French male canoeists
Living people
People from Dinan
Olympic canoeists of France
ICF Canoe Sprint World Championships medalists in Canadian
Sportspeople from Côtes-d'Armor